
Gmina Osielsko is a rural gmina (administrative district) in Bydgoszcz County, Kuyavian-Pomeranian Voivodeship, in north-central Poland.

Osielsko is the richest gmina in Kuyavian-Pomeranian Voivodeship. Osielsko's main source of wealth is personal income tax paid by inhabitants of this gmina.

Villages
Gmina Osielsko contains the villages and settlements of Bożenkowo, Czarnówczyn, Jagodowo, Jarużyn, Jarużyn-Kolonia, Maksymilianowo, Myślęcinek, Niemcz, Niwy, Osielsko, Strzelce Leśne, Wilcze and Żołędowo.

Neighbouring gminas
Gmina Osielsko is bordered by the city of Bydgoszcz and by the gminas of Dobrcz, Koronowo and Sicienko.

Religion

There are 4 Roman Catholic parishes in Gmina Osielsko:
 parafia św. Maksymiliana Kolbego – Maksymilianowo
 parafia MB Wspomożenia Wiernych – Niemcz
 Parafia Narodzenia Najświętszej Maryi Panny w Osielsku – Osielsko
 parafia Podwyższenia Krzyża Świętego – Żołędowo
Osielsko is also a seat of dekanat Osielsko (administrative district of the Roman Catholic Church).

References

Polish official population figures 2006

Osielsko
Bydgoszcz County